Volny or Volný is a surname and placename. In many Slavic languages, it is an adjective meaning "free" (as in speech) and has various gender forms (Czech feminine: Volná; Russian feminine: Volnaya; Russian neuter: Volnoye). The Polish form is Wolny. Volny is also a romanization of a Russian plural noun meaning "waves". The surname or toponym may refer to:

People
Anatol Volny (1902–1937), Belarusian artist
Carl Volny (born 1987), Canadian football player
Patrycja Volny (born 1988), Polish actress

Places
Volny (village), a village (khutor) in the Republic of Adygea, Russia
Volnoye, Republic of Adygea, a village (selo) in the Republic of Adygea, Russia
Volnoye, name of several other rural localities in Russia

Other
 VOLNÝ, subsidiary of Telekom Austria in Czech Republic.

See also
 Wolny, Polish surname

Slavic-language surnames